Simwŏn-sa is a Korean Buddhist temple located in Yŏntan-gun, North Hwanghae Province, North Korea. The temple contains one of the oldest wooden buildings in North Korea, as well as a famous peach tree and stupas from the late Koryo dynasty.

 Pogwang Hall (보광전/普光殿)
Built in 1374, is the fourth oldest wooden building in North Korea, and houses a painting by the famous Neo-Confucian scholar Yi Saek. The hall is notable for its elaborate doors decorated with carved lotus blossoms, fish, birds, and snakes.

 Ungjin Hall (응진전/雄津殿)
The former monk's dormitory, this simple hall now houses the complex's caretakers.

See also
 National Treasures of North Korea
 Korean Buddhism
 Korean architecture

Buildings and structures in North Hwanghae Province
Buddhist temples in North Korea
National Treasures of North Korea